Nutty Buddy was an ice cream cone topped with vanilla ice cream, chocolate ice cream, chocolate and peanuts, manufactured in the United States.

The "Nutty Buddy" was originally created and produced by Seymour Ice Cream Company, which was located in the Port Norfolk section of Dorchester, Massachusetts and named after its owner, Buddy Seymourian. Seymour Ice Cream ceased operations in the 1980s.

The official Nutty Buddy is no longer produced commercially in large numbers across the United States. Its former manufacturer was the Sweetheart Cup Company, which was also the manufacturer of the machines that produced the cones; Sweetheart went out of business in 1998. One of the last manufacturers of the original Nutty Buddy is Purity Dairies in Nashville, Tennessee.

References

External links 
 Nutty Buddy on the Purity Dairies site (Wayback Machine archive)

Ice cream brands
American brands